The 2018–19 season was Northampton Town's 122nd season of existence and their first season back in League Two after a two-year absence. Along with competing in League Two, the club will also participate in the FA Cup, EFL Cup and EFL Trophy.

The season ran from 1 July 2018 to 30 June 2019.

Players

Pre-season
The Cobblers announced they would face Northampton Sileby Rangers, St. Albans City, Brackley Town, Hull City U23, Barnet and Manchester United XI.

Competitions

League Two

League table

Results summary

League position by match

Matches

FA Cup

The first round draw was made live on BBC by Dennis Wise and Dion Dublin on 22 October.

Carabao Cup

On 15 June 2018, the draw for the first round was made in Vietnam.

Checkatrade Trophy

On 13 July 2018, the initial group stage draw bar the U21 invited clubs was announced. The draw for the second round was made live on Talksport by Leon Britton and Steve Claridge on 16 November. On 8 December, the third round draw was drawn by Alan McInally and Matt Le Tissier on Soccer Saturday.

Appearances, goals and cards

Awards

Club awards
At the end of the season, Northampton's annual award ceremony, including categories voted for by the players and backroom staff, the supporters, will see the players recognised for their achievements for the club throughout the 2018–19 season.

Transfers

Transfers in

Transfers out

Loans in

Loans out

References

Northampton Town
Northampton Town F.C. seasons